Ajin (آجين, also romanized as Ājīn) is a populated place in Central District of Asadabad County, Hamadan Province, Iran. At the 2006 census, its population was 3,343, in 766 families.

References 

Populated places in Asadabad County
Cities in Hamadan Province